The Golden Hits of Jerry Lee Lewis is the third studio album by musician Jerry Lee Lewis that was released on Smash Records in 1964. It was Lewis's first album with the label after leaving Sun Records.

Background
After his marriage to his 13-year-old cousin Myra and the resulting scandal that ensued when he toured Britain in May 1958, Lewis was blacklisted from radio and his singles flopped. By 1963, he had scored only one minor hit (a cover of the Ray Charles song "What'd I Say") and, frustrated by what he saw as Sam Phillips's indifference, signed with Smash. The team at Smash (a division of Mercury Records) came up "I'm On Fire," a song that they felt would be perfect for Lewis and, as Colin Escott writes in the sleeve notes to the retrospective A Half Century of Hits, "Mercury held the presses, thinking they had found Lewis’s comeback hit, and it might have happened if the Beatles hadn’t arrived in America, changing radio playlists almost overnight. Mercury didn’t really know what to do with Lewis after that."  One of Smash's first decisions was to record a retread of his Sun hits, which may have been inspired by the continuing enthusiasm European audiences had shown for Lewis's brand of rock and roll.

Recording
Although competent, the remakes on The Golden Hits of Jerry Lee Lewis could never measure up to the magic found on his early Sun sides. In his book Jerry Lee Lewis: Lost and Found, biographer Joe Bonomo writes at length about the album's shortcomings: "The results were anemic and odd, even four decades down the line. The opening 25 seconds of 'Whole Lotta Shakin' Going On,' the first number tackled by Jerry Lee at the sessions, reveal the nature of the problem: so crude and essential as recorded by Jack Clement in 1957, the song is garlanded in Nashville with crispy-EQ'ed hi-hat percussion, an intrusive walking electric bass, and a syncopated rhythm guitar that feels like an annoying kid brother tagging along looking for some hijinks. The reverb applied to Jerry Lee's voice sounds contrived and artificial after Sam Phillips hands-on magic at 706 Union, and sweetened with chirpy female backing singers who were meant to complement but end up sounding as if they'd wandered into the wrong party."  In an 2019 interview with Randy Fox of Vintage Rock, producer Jerry Kennedy lamented, "Jerry Lee was great in the studio, but to be honest, I felt we were desecrating something sacred. I've always been a fan of the original Sun recordings, and I've never felt remakes can match the magic of the originals."

Reception
The Golden Hits of Jerry Lee Lewis was released on January 1, 1964, making the charts briefly before vanishing (it peaked at number 40). Matt Fink of AllMusic argues that "Great Balls of Fire," "Whole Lotta Shakin' Goin' On," "Breathless" and "High School Confidential" are given an "overall bigger, booming sound with backup vocalists and a brass section, but most would probably still give the originals pre-eminence."

Track listing
Side A
 "Whole Lotta Shakin' Going On" (Dave "Curlie" Williams, Sunny David)
 "Fools like Me" (Jack Clement, Murphy Maddox)
 "Great Balls of Fire" (Otis Blackwell, Jack Hammer)
 "I'll Make It All Up to You" (Charlie Rich)
"Down the Line" (Roy Orbison)
 "End of the Road" (Jerry Lee Lewis)
Side B
 "Breathless" (Otis Blackwell) 
 "Crazy Arms" (Ralph Mooney, Chuck Seals) - 2:41 
 "You Win Again" (Hank Williams) 
 "High School Confidential" (Ron Hargrave, Jerry Lee Lewis) - 2:27 
"Break-Up" (Charlie Rich)
 "Your Cheatin' Heart" (Hank Williams)

Personnel
Technical
Billy Sherrill - recording engineer
John Hester, Ray Butts - assistant engineer

Jerry Lee Lewis albums
1964 greatest hits albums
Rock-and-roll albums